Garsaman-e-Bala (also Romanized as Garsāmān-e-Bālā, Garsaman Bala, and Garsemān-e Bālā) is a village in Birk Rural District, in the Central District of Mehrestan County, Sistan and Baluchestan Province, Iran. At the 2006 census, its population was 256, in 54 families.

References 

Populated places in Mehrestan County